Sycowa Huta  is a village in the administrative district of Gmina Kościerzyna, within Kościerzyna County, Pomeranian Voivodeship, in northern Poland.

The village has a population of 62.

References

See also
 History of Pomerania

Sycowa Huta